

Harry Kennedy (born February 21, 1952) is an American Democratic politician, who has been a member of the Missouri Senate and Missouri House of Representatives. He is currently a staffer for the St. Louis Board of Aldermen President Lewis Reed and a Democratic Committeeman for St. Louis' 14th Ward.

He graduated from the University of Missouri-St. Louis in 1984 with a Bachelor of Arts degree in speech communication. He is a member of the Catholic parish of St. Mary Margdalene in St. Louis.

Kennedy was a member of the Missouri House of Representatives from 1997 through 2001. He won election to the Missouri Senate from the third district in a special election in 2001. He was re-elected from the first district in 2004, changing districts due to re-districting. Kennedy would have been forced out of the Senate in 2009 due to term limits, but resigned in October 2008 to take his current position with Lewis Reed's office. During his Senate tenure, he was a member of the following Committees:
Aging, Families, and Mental Health
Economic Development, Tourism, and Local Government
Financial and Governmental Organizations and Elections
Pensions, Veteran's Affairs and General Laws

See also
List of current Missouri State Senators

Sources
Official Manual, State of Missouri, 2005-2006.  Jefferson City, MO:Secretary of State.

References

External links
Missouri Senate - Harry Kennedy official government website
Project Vote Smart - Harry J. Kennedy (MO) profile
Follow the Money - Harry Kennedy
2006 2004 2000 1998 1996 campaign contributions

Democratic Party Missouri state senators
Democratic Party members of the Missouri House of Representatives
1952 births
Living people
Politicians from St. Louis
University of Missouri–St. Louis alumni